Black Sheep Boy is the third studio album by American indie rock band Okkervil River, released on April 5, 2005. The title is inspired by the song "Black Sheep Boy" by 1960s folk singer Tim Hardin. The album deals with Hardin's struggle with heroin addiction and Okkervil River lead singer Will Sheff's failed relationships and heartbreaks. The album cover features the work of Providence artist William Schaff.

Background
Most of the songs for the record were written in February 2004 in Bloomington, Indiana by Will Sheff. Sheff describes the album's theme in a 2005 interview:

"The Black Sheep Boy is a fantastical character that crops up here and there on the album. In the lyrics pretty much anything in quotes is the voice of the Black Sheep Boy. I think a lot of the dirtier, rougher, more obtuse songs are the product of the Black Sheep Boy."

The writing of the album took place during a difficult time for the band. The relative lack of commercial success of their previous albums meant that the band's future was in doubt and Sheff was rendered homeless in order to make ends meet and afford the costs related to the band's commitments.

Reception

Black Sheep Boy has received general acclaim. On the review aggregate site Metacritic, the album has a score of 86 out of 100, indicating "universal acclaim".

The album was ranked number 22 on Amazon.com's Top 50 Albums of 2005 list. The music online magazine Pitchfork placed Black Sheep Boy at number 174 on their list of top 200 albums of the 2000s.

Track listing

Musicians
 Will Sheff – vocals, acoustic guitar, electric guitar, keyboards, wurlitzer
 Howard Draper – lap steel, pump organ, mandolin, bass, synthesizer
 Jonathan Meiburg – vocals, piano, wurlitzer, pump organ, Casio SK-1, electric guitar
 Travis Nelsen – vocals, drums, tambourine
 Zachary Thomas – vocals, bass, mandolin
 Seth Warren – electronics, drums, vibraphone, whirlies, shaker
 Amy Annelle – harmony vocals
 Brian Beattie – bowed bass, sampler, field recordings
 Rebecca Browne – violin
 Alison Derrick – viola
 Michael Kapinus – trumpet
 Caroline Slack – violin
 Ben Westney – cello
 Victoria Wolff – cello

See also
 Black Sheep Boy Appendix

References

2005 albums
Okkervil River albums
Jagjaguwar albums